Sergio Casal and Emilio Sánchez were the defending champions, but they did not participate as a team this year.

Stefan Edberg and Anders Järryd won the title, defeating  Emilio Sánchez and Javier Sánchez, 7–6, 6–3 in the final.

Seeds
Champion seeds are indicated in bold text while text in italics indicates the round in which those seeds were eliminated.

Draw

References

External links
 1987 Swedish Open Doubles Draw

1987 Grand Prix (tennis)
Swedish Open
Swed